The Black Valley or Cummeenduff is a remote valley at the southern end of the MacGillycuddy's Reeks mountain range in Kerry, situated south of the Gap of Dunloe and north of Moll's Gap; it is used as a southerly access into the Gap of Dunloe.  

The Black Valley is part of the Kerry Way, a walkers version of the Ring of Kerry beginning and ending in Killarney, and is also part of a 55–kilometre loop of the Killarney–Gap of Dunloe–Black Valley–Moll's Gap area, popular with cyclists. The Black Valley is also a southerly access route to the Head of the Gap in the Gap of Dunloe, and to Lord Brandon's Cottage. The Black Valley is also noted for being one of the last places in mainland Ireland to be connected to the electricity and telephone networks due to its remoteness, which happened in 1976.

See also 

 Gap of Dunloe
 Moll's Gap
 Ladies View
 Torc Waterfall
 Stumpa Dúloigh

References

Tourist attractions in County Kerry
Mountains and hills of County Kerry